Paul Bunyans Cabin is located in the Livingston Range, Glacier National Park in the U.S. state of Montana. Paul Bunyans Cabin is on a rock spur immediately SSE of Longfellow Peak and from certain angles appears as a Log cabin. Lake Evangeline is northeast of the peak and Ruger Lake is to the east.

See also
 Mountains and mountain ranges of Glacier National Park (U.S.)

References

Mountains of Montana
Mountains of Glacier National Park (U.S.)
Livingston Range